König is a German surname.

König may also refer to:

Businesses
Koenig (organ builder), a French pipe organ builder
Koenig & Bauer, a German company that makes printing presses
König Brewery, a brewery in Duisburg, Germany and its beer König Pilsener
König Ludwig Schlossbrauerei, a brewery in Fürstenfeldbruck, Germany
Koenig Specials, a German luxury car tuning house

Places
König (crater), a lunar crater named after Rudolf König
Koenig, Missouri, a community in the United States
Konig, South Carolina, a populated place
König Glacier, South Georgia
König Pilsener Arena, a sports centre in Oberhausen, Germany
König Palast, sports venue in Krefeld, Germany
Koenig Valley, Antarctica
3815 König, an asteroid
Bad König, a spa town in Hesse, Germany
Museum Koenig, a  history museum in Bonn, Germany, named after Alexander Koenig

Science 
Kőnig's lemma, in graph theory
König's syndrome, a syndrome of abdominal pain in relation to meals
König's theorem (disambiguation)

Transportation 
 Formula König, a formula racing series active from 1988 to 2004
 König SC 430, König SD 570, aircraft engines designed by Dieter König
 , a German battleship class at the time of World War I
 , the lead ship of that class
 , a German battleship at the time of World War I
 , a frigate of the Prussian navy
 , a German ocean liner at the time of World War I

Other uses
Koenig Memorandum, an Israeli government document of 1976
 "König", a song by Nico from the 1985 album Camera Obscura

See also
 
 
Kenig
King (surname)
Königsberg (disambiguation)